Latvian Human Rights Committee is a non-governmental human rights organization in Latvia. It is a member of international human rights and anti-racism NGOs FIDH, AEDH. According to the authors of the study "Ethnopolitics in Latvia", former CBSS Commissioner on Democratic Institutions and Human Rights Ole Espersen "had visited LHRC various times and had used mostly the data of that organisation in his views on Latvia".

History
In 1992, LHRC was founded (as the Latvian Human Rights and International Humanitarian Co-operation Committee) by a group of people co-operating since 1990, led by Tatjana Ždanoka and Vladimir Bogdanov. In 1995, LHRC joined FIDH and was registered by Latvian authorities.

Since 1994, LHRC periodically publishes an updated list of differences in rights between citizens and non-citizens of Latvia. Since 1997, LHRC supports UNITED for Intercultural Action. In 2007, LHRC has joined ENAR and AEDH.

Publications
The following printed publications in English were issued or prepared by LHRC:

Human Rights and Minorities in Latvia (1999) 
Report on the Implementation of the Framework Convention for the Protection of National Minorities in the Republic of Latvia (2002)
Media Legislation, Minority Issues, and Implications for Latvia (2003) 
Citizens of a Non-Existent State (2008; second edition 2011; includes the aforementioned list)
 (prepared in co-operation with Legal Information Centre for Human Rights)

 Language policy of Latvia (2020).

Cases before international judicial bodies

LHRC members have worked on the following cases before international human rights institutions:

Agafonova v. Latvia (UN HRC) — Latvia has issued residence permit for the applicant
Ignatāne v. Latvia (UN HRC) — views in favour of Ignatane (2001)
Podkolzina v. Latvia (ECtHR; later, British lawyer W. Bowring has taken the representation) — judgment in favour of Podkolzina (2002) 
Rudova v. Latvia (ECtHR) — decision in favour of government (2002)
Kuhareca v. Latvia (ECtHR) — decision in favour of government (2004) 
Ždanoka v. Latvia (ECtHR; later, British lawyer W. Bowring has taken the representation) — 5:2 judgment in favour of Ždanoka (2004), 13:4 Grand Chamber final judgment in favour of government (2006) 
Ševanova v. Latvia (ECtHR) — judgment in favour of Ševanova (2006), decision to struck the case out of list, paying costs to Ševanova (2007),
Mitina v. Latvia (ECtHR) — partial decision (2002) and final decision (2006) in favour of government 
Miholapa v. Latvia (ECtHR; later, British lawyer W. Bowring has taken the representation) — judgment in favour of Miholapa (2007) 
Andrejeva v. Latvia (ECtHR) — Grand Chamber 16:1 judgment in favour of Andrejeva (2009) 
Raihman v. Latvia (UN HRC) — 13:2 views in favour of Raihman (2010)
Petrova v. Latvia (EctHR) — Chamber judgment in favour of Petrova (2014)
Petropavlovskis v. Latvia (ECtHR) — Chamber judgment in favour of government (2015)

References

External links
LHRC website

Human rights organisations based in Latvia
International Federation for Human Rights member organizations
Minority rights